Central Rook Fortress (矢倉中飛車 yagura nakabisha) is a Double Fortress (Double Static Rook) shogi opening.

This strategy characteristically swings the player's rook to the central file to support an attack there.

Central Rook Fortress should not be confused with Yagura's Central Rook (矢倉流中飛車 yagura-ryuu nakabisha) which is an unrelated Central Rook strategy named after professional player Norihiro Yagura.

See also

 Fortress opening
 Morishita System
 Akutsu Rapid Attack Yagura
 Waki System
 Spearing the Sparrow
 Yagura vs Right Fourth File Rook
 Static Rook
 Central Rook

Bibliography

 森下卓 『将棋基本戦法 居飛車編』 日本将棋連盟、1997年9月10日 
 森下卓 『なんでも中飛車』 創元社  2003年

External links

 Shogi Maze: Yagura: Nakabisha Strategy

Shogi openings
Fortress openings
Central Rook openings